Pinnacle Natural Area Preserve is an  Natural Area Preserve in Russell County, Virginia.

At least nine rare species and two rare natural communities make their home within the boundaries of the preserve. It is home to the globally rare Big Cedar Creek millipede (Brachoria falcifera), known only from the preserve and several nearby locations. Two globally rare plants, Canby's mountain-lover (Paxistima canbyi) and Carolina saxifrage (Saxifraga caroliniana), grow upon the preserve's limestone cliffs, where they are joined by American harebell (Campanula rotundifolia), which is rare in Virginia. The preserve's creek banks host the rare glade spurge (Euphorbia purpurea).

Pinnacle Natural Area Preserve is owned and maintained by the Virginia Department of Conservation and Recreation. The preserve includes improvements such as a parking area,  of hiking trails, and a suspension foot bridge.

See also
 List of Virginia Natural Area Preserves

References

External links
Virginia Department of Conservation and Recreation: Pinnacle Natural Area Preserve

Virginia Natural Area Preserves
Protected areas of Russell County, Virginia